Silicon oxynitride is a ceramic material with the chemical formula SiOxNy. While in amorphous forms its composition can continuously vary between SiO2 (silica) and Si3N4 (silicon nitride), the only known intermediate crystalline phase is Si2N2O. It is found in nature as the rare mineral sinoite in some meteorites and can be synthesized in the laboratory.

Properties

The crystalline structure of silicon oxynitride is built by SiN3O tetrahedra connected through oxygen atoms along the c axis and through nitrogen atoms perpendicular to it. The strong covalent bonding of this structure results in high flexural strength and resistance to heating and oxidation up to temperatures of about 1600 °C.

Synthesis
Polycrystalline silicon oxynitride ceramics are primarily produced by nitridation of a mixture of Si and silicon dioxide at a temperature above melting point of silicon (1414 °C), in the range 1420–1500 °C:
3 Si + SiO2 + 2 N2 → 2 Si2N2O

Silicon oxynitride materials with various stoichiometries may also arise as the products of pyrolysis of preceramic polymers, namely polysilanes and polyethoxysilsesquiazane. SiON materials thus obtained are referred to as polymer derived ceramics or PDCs. By using preceramic polymers, dense or porous Si oxynitride ceramics in complex forms can be obtained using shaping techniques more typically applied for polymers.

Applications
Thin films of silicon oxynitride can be grown on silicon using a variety of plasma deposition techniques and used in microelectronics as a dielectric layer alternative to silicon dioxide and silicon nitride with the advantages of low leakage currents and high thermal stability. These films have an amorphous structure and therefore their chemical composition can widely deviate from Si2N2O. By changing the nitrogen/oxygen ratio in these films, their refractive index can be continuously tuned between the value of ~1.45 for silicon dioxide and ~2.0 for silicon nitride. This property is useful for gradient-index optics components such as graded-index fibers.

Silicon oxynitrides can be doped with metal atoms. The most common example is sialon, a family of quaternary SiAlON compound. Quaternary silicon oxynitrides containing a lanthanide element, such as La, Eu or/and Ce are used as phosphors.

References

Ceramic materials
Nitrides
Oxides
Silicon compounds